Corian is a brand of solid surface material created by DuPont. Its primary use is as a countertop, benchtop surface, wash basin, wall panel, temples for home etc. Though it has many other applications. It is composed of acrylic polymer and alumina trihydrate (ATH), a material derived from bauxite ore. Corian is the original material of this type, created by DuPont scientists in 1967. Since DuPont's patent on solid surfaces ran out, a number of direct competitors to Corian have come out.

Most Corian is manufactured at a DuPont facility near Buffalo, New York. Cross-section cuts show consistent color and particulate patterning evenly distributed throughout the material, giving rise to the category name "solid surface".

Corian must be sold and installed by a DuPont certified fabricator; such installations come with a 10-year warranty covering both the product and installation, for interior residential applications.

History 

Donald Slocum, a DuPont chemist, is credited as inventing Corian solid surface in 1967. His name appears on the patent issued in October 1968. The product was first introduced for sale in 1971, at the National Association of Home Builders meeting in Houston, Texas.

Originally conceived as a kitchen and bath material available in a single color, Corian is manufactured and delivered in more than 100 colors.

In 2013, the company announced its Endless Evolution initiative in an effort to improve the material and find additional applications for its use. As part of this initiative, in 2014 DuPont introduced its "Deep Color" technology. The enhancement allows for the material to be created in deeper, darker colors that are more resistant to scratches and cuts than earlier generation Corian material.

In 2017, Corian marked its fiftieth year with a new look and marketing campaign. Its renewed visual identity and logo was designed and developed by Italian branding agency GBR Design.

Product lines 

DuPont has issued various sub-branded releases of the material which contain unique design elements or methods of manufacture.  Notably these have included:
 Corian Private Collection: First colors introduced in 2002; this product line is inspired by the randomness of patterns found in nature.  Some colors and patterns in this product line resemble stone and other natural materials and all colors have complex non-repeating patterns not found in other Corian products.
 Corian Terra Collection: First colors introduced in the 2000s; this product line contains between six and twenty percent recycled content.
 Corian Illumination Series: First colors introduced in 2007; this product line is semi-translucent allowing for new designs calling for backlit applications.
 Corian Metallic Series: First colors introduced in 2010; this product line contains particulate of gold and silver fleck to give the product a metallic appearance.  This creates a depth that simulates movement and variation of color when the same installation is viewed from different angles.
 Martha Stewart Living Collection: First colors introduced in the United States in 2010; this product line is a collection of colors created by home improvement celebrity Martha Stewart.
 Corian Deep Color Technology: First colors introduced in 2013; this product line uses new "Deep Color" technology to produce darker, more scratch-resistant colors.
 Corian Quartz: Rebranded in 2018, DuPont's Zodiaq quartz product was re-introduced as Corian Quartz.  This product is an engineered stone and is not a solid surface material in a technical sense.

Material characteristics 

Corian is:
 Non-porous
 Stain resistant
 Seamless appearance: In the fabrication process, joints can be made nearly invisible by joining the relevant pieces with Corian's own color-matched two-part acrylic adhesive. The pieces are clamped tightly together in order to express any excess adhesive. After the adhesive cures, the area is sanded and polished to create a near-seamless joint. This seamless appearance is a signature characteristic of the material.
 Repairable and renewable: Cuts and scratches can be buffed out with a Scotch-Brite pad or orbital sander.
 Thermoformable: Flexible when heated, Corian can be shaped and molded into generally limitless forms which can be used in commercial and artistic projects through a process called thermoforming.

Heat resistance: the material is heat resistant up to 100 °C (212 °F), but can be damaged by excess heat. DuPont recommends the use of trivets when the material is installed in kitchens.

Scratches: The material can be scratched, with scratches particularly noticeable on darker colors.

Corian does not lose its visual appearance or fade for many years, sometime decades.

Safety

Safety of installed material
Corian meets or exceeds current emissions guidelines for volatile organic compounds (VOCs), hazardous air pollutants (HAPs) and is "Greenguard Indoor Air Quality Certified". Corian is nontoxic and nonallergenic to humans. It is free of heavy metals and complies with the EU Directive 2002/95EC on the Restriction of Hazardous Substances (RoHS).  Its hygienic properties make it popular in installations where maintaining sanitary conditions is important (e.g. hospitals and restaurants).

Fabricator safety 
In 2014, the New England Journal of Medicine reported a case of a 64-year-old exercise physiologist who died from lung disease consistent with idiopathic pulmonary fibrosis after 16 years of exposure to Corian dust. Dust from Corian was found in the patient's shop of Corian fabrication and lung upon autopsy. The authors said that the case was consistent with Corian dust causing idiopathic pulmonary fibrosis, but did not prove causality. DuPont scientists responded that exposure to other materials could not be ruled out, nor did they rule out it wasn't caused from the dust which consists of aluminum trihydrate (ATH) derived from bauxite.  Fabricators must properly protect themselves from fine Corian particulates generated during milling, and sanding.  Fabricators should always wear a proper certified respirator and keep shop and environment clean of Corian dust at all times.

References

External links 
 

Brand name materials
DuPont products